The Rukai is a lake in Krakės Eldership, Kėdainiai District Municipality, central Lithuania. It belongs to the Dotnuvėlė basin (part of the Nevėžis basin).

Coasts of the lake are flat, swampy, covered by reed beds.

The name Rukai comes from the village name Rukai.

References

Lakes of Kėdainiai District Municipality